Q-vectors are used in atmospheric dynamics to understand physical processes such as vertical motion and frontogenesis. Q-vectors are not physical quantities that can be measured in the atmosphere but are derived from the quasi-geostrophic equations and can be used in the previous diagnostic situations. On meteorological charts, Q-vectors point toward upward motion and away from downward motion.  Q-vectors are an alternative to the omega equation for diagnosing vertical motion in the quasi-geostrophic equations.

Derivation
First derived in 1978, Q-vector derivation can be simplified for the midlatitudes, using the midlatitude β-plane quasi-geostrophic prediction equations:

  (x component of quasi-geostrophic momentum equation)
  (y component of quasi-geostrophic momentum equation)
  (quasi-geostrophic thermodynamic equation)

And the thermal wind equations:

 (x component of thermal wind equation)

 (y component of thermal wind equation)

From these equations we can get expressions for the Q-vector:

And in vector form:

Plugging these Q-vector equations into the quasi-geostrophic omega equation gives:

If second derivatives are approximated as a negative sign, as is true for a sinusoidal function, the above in an adiabatic setting may be viewed as a statement about upward motion:

This expression shows that the divergence of the Q-vector is associated with downward motion. Therefore, convergent  forces ascent and divergent  forces descend. Q-vectors and all ageostrophic flow exist to preserve thermal wind balance. Therefore, low level Q-vectors tend to point in the direction of low-level ageostrophic winds.

Applications
Q-vectors can be determined wholly with: geopotential height and temperature on a constant pressure surface. Q-vectors always point in the direction of ascending air. For an idealized cyclone and anticyclone in the Northern Hemisphere (where ), cyclones have Q-vectors which point parallel to the thermal wind and anticyclones have Q-vectors that point antiparallel to the thermal wind. This means upward motion in the area of warm air advection and downward motion in the area of cold air advection.

In frontogenesis, temperature gradients need to tighten for initiation. For those situations Q-vectors point toward ascending air and the tightening thermal gradients. In areas of convergent Q-vectors, cyclonic vorticity is created, and in divergent areas, anticyclonic vorticity is created.

References

Meteorological concepts
Synoptic meteorology and weather
Atmospheric dynamics
Fluid dynamics